Kaiserstuhl OW railway station is a Swiss railway station on the Brünig line, owned by the Zentralbahn, that links Interlaken and Lucerne. The station is located by the hamlet of Kaiserstuhl, in the municipality of Lungern and the canton of Obwalden.

Services 
The following services stop at Kaiserstuhl OW:

References

External links 
 
 

Railway stations in the canton of Obwalden
Lungern
Zentralbahn stations